The Pyongyang Circus is a multi-function building located in Pyongyang, North Korea. It was completed in 1989.

The circus has a floor space of 54,000m2. There are facilities for acrobatics, synchronized swimming, stunts on ice, clowns, and animal performances. It is also one of the theatres used for the April Spring Friendship Arts Festival. The Pyongyang Circus was renovated in 2012.

The circus appears in the film Comrade Kim Goes Flying.

See also 

 Culture of North Korea
 List of theatres in North Korea

References

Further reading

External links 

Pyongyang Circus picture album  at Naenara

Buildings and structures in Pyongyang
Event venues established in 1989
1989 establishments in North Korea
Sports venues completed in 1989
20th-century architecture in North Korea